Chang Wook-jin is a diplomat of the South Korean Ministry of Foreign Affairs, and was formerly the Special Assistant of the Secretary-General of the United Nations, Ban Ki-moon.

References

Year of birth missing (living people)
Place of birth missing (living people)
Living people
South Korean diplomats